Mezzani is a municipality in Italy.

Mezzani may also refer to:

Mezzani (pasta), Short-cut extruded pasta, with a short curved tube
Giovanni Mezzani, Italian sport shooter